G. K. Thornhill was the 17th Surveyor General of Ceylon. He was appointed in 1932, succeeding A. H. G. Dawson, and held the office until 1937. He was succeeded by L. G. O. Woodhouse.

References

T